Love Is Just a Game is the fifth studio album by American country singer Larry Gatlin issued on Monument Records in 1977. The album reached number 7 on the Billboard Top Country Albums chart and the title track single "Love Is Just a Game" reached number 3 on the Billboard Hot Country Singles chart and number 6 on the RPM Country Tracks chart in Canada.

Track listing

All songs written by Larry Gatlin.

Side 1
"Love Is Just a Game" – 3:30
"Tomorrow" – 2:32
"Anything but Leavin'" – 2:44
"If Practice Makes Perfect" – 3:27
"Everytime a Plane Flies Over Our House" – 2:59

Side 2
"I Just Wish You Were Someone I Love" – 3:10
"Kiss It All Goodbye" – 2:41
"I Don't Wanna Cry" – 2:46
"It's Love at Last" – 2:56
"Steps" – 3:03
"Alleluia" – 2:00

Personnel
Grady Martin, Reggie Young, Johnny Christopher, Jimmy Colvard, Jerry Steve Smith, Pete Wade, Steve Gatlin, Rudy Gatlin - guitar
Gene Chrisman, Phillip Fajardo - drums
Tommy Cogbill - bass
Bobby Emmons, Bobby Wood, Shane Keister, William Golden - keyboards
Lloyd Green, Michael G. Smith - steel guitar
Farrell Morris - percussion
Lisa Silver - fiddle
Sheldon Kurland, Carl Gorodetzky, Lennie Haight, George Binkley, Steven Smith, Christian Teal, Marvin Chantry, Gary Vanosdale, Byron Bach, Roy Christensen, Wilfred Lehmann, Ann Migliore - strings
Bill Justis - string arrangements

Production
Produced by Fred Foster
Brent Maher and Don Cobb - engineer
Ken Kim - photography, art direction

References

1977 albums
Larry Gatlin albums
Monument Records albums
Albums produced by Fred Foster